Cosmas II Atticus, (? – after 1147) was Patriarch of Constantinople from April 1146, until February 1147. He was born in Aegina, in Greece, and was a deacon of Hagia Sophia before his ascension, after Michael II Kourkouas abdicated. He was highly respected for his learning and for his holy character. Cosmas reigned during the rule of Byzantine emperor Manuel I Comnenus.

Deposition
Cosmas was condemned and deposed on 26 February 1147 by a synod held at the Palace of Blachernae because of indulgence in relation to the monk Niphon, a condemned Bogomil since 1144, whom he received in his home and at his table.

The exact reasons for the conviction and deposition of Cosmas II are not clearly established; perhaps he was the victim of political intrigue. It is clear however that the Emperor Manuel intervened directly in forming the Synod that deposed Cosmas, interviewing personally those who accused him, and testing Cosmas directly on his opinions of the heretical Niphon. This affair is typical both of the doctrinal controversies common in the reign of Manuel I, and also of the Emperor's readiness to become actively involved in them.

References 

12th-century patriarchs of Constantinople
People from Aegina
Officials of Manuel I Komnenos